Vail Mountain School (VMS) is an independent K -12 college preparatory school in Vail, Colorado. 

VMS is accredited by the Association of Colorado Independent Schools and is a member of the National Association of Independent Schools. Its curriculum includes fine art, music, performing arts, and a physical training program.

Notable alumni

 Michael Johnston

References

Schools in Eagle County, Colorado
Private high schools in Colorado
Private middle schools in Colorado
Private elementary schools in Colorado
Preparatory schools in Colorado